Fenix TX (styled as Fenix*TX) is an American pop punk band. The band originally formed as Riverfenix in 1995 in Houston, Texas. They released an EP, G.B.O.H., and an album, Riverfenix, on independent record labels, before having to change their name due to a cease and desist order from the estate of actor River Phoenix. Following the change of name, they signed with major label MCA Records in 1999. On MCA, they released two further albums, 1999's Fenix TX and 2001's Lechuza, which collectively sold over 600,000 units. The band broke up in 2002 over creative differences.

After the split, bassist Adam Lewis and drummer Damon DeLaPaz devoted themselves to their now defunct side project Sing the Body Electric, while vocalist/guitarist Will Salazar and guitarist Chris Lewis formed the band Denver Harbor.  Donnie Reyes went on to join Khobretti.

In September 2005, Fenix TX announced their reunion. They released a live album, Purple Reign in Blood, and supported it with tours across the United States and Japan.

Lead vocalist and guitarist William Salazar is the band's only constant member.

History

Early years
The band that would ultimately become Fenix TX formed in late 1995 in Houston, Texas under the name Riverfenix by guitarists Will Salazar and Damon DeLaPaz (also the drummer for 30 Foot Fall at the time), and vocalist Carl Lockstedt. However, Carl's tenure was short-lived after recruiting bassist Adam Lewis and drummer Donnie Reyes. At this point, Salazar was forced to take over vocal duties. With this solidified line-up, the four piece immediately set to work by playing extensively on the Texas pop punk scene alongside such renowned bands as 30 Foot Fall, Good Riddance and Goldfinger. Popular venues included local clubs such as Fitzgerald's (whose head of security earned an homage in the Riverfenix song "Skinhead Jessie"). In 1996, the band released their debut EP G.B.O.H. under the Houston-based record label Fuzzgun Records, which they then followed by playing the Mullets Across America Tour with Home Grown, Cousin Oliver and The Hippos. During this time the band would also concentrate on distributing copies of their demos to other record labels. Mojo Records showed interest in the band, however, due to procrastination and indecision the process never came to fruition. However, two Mojo interns Richard and Stefanie Reines, were on the brink of starting their own label, Drive-Thru Records, and agreed to sign Riverfenix as their first band.

Riverfenix/Fenix TX 

In December 1997, Drive-Thru released Riverfenix's thirteen-track full-length debut Riverfenix, produced by Jim Barnes. Within the following year, the album managed to sell out its first three print runs of 5,000 copies each, which was quite an achievement for an independent record label operating out of the owners' garage. The CD's lyrics and melodies caught the attention of Blink-182's Mark Hoppus, whose sister was at that time dating Riverfenix's DeLaPaz. Hoppus offered the band an opening slot on an upcoming Blink-182 tour, and eventually became their manager. However, due to the schedule of his own band and the popularity of Blink-182's 1999 album Enema of the State, Hoppus passed managing duties onto Blink-182 manager Rick DeVoe. While Riverfenix 's song "Speechless" was slowly garnering radio airplay and major labels' attention, Hoppus' effort in promoting Riverfenix was overheard by Blink-182's record label MCA, who showed major interest in signing the band.

Two obstacles, however, separated Riverfenix from MCA: The band was still under contract with Drive-Thru Records, who were unwilling to compromise. Additionally, the estate of late actor River Phoenix filed a cease and desist order against the band, barring further usage of the name Riverfenix. While Drive-Thru Records and MCA settled for a distribution agreement, the band discarded the "River" from their name and appended Texas' postal abbreviation. Thus, Riverfenix became Fenix TX. With a new record deal, Fenix TX re-recorded the majority of their 1997 eponymous album for their MCA debut Fenix TX, and released it on July 13, 1999. The album debuted at No. 115 on the Billboard 200 and reached No. 3 on Billboard's Top Heatseekers. The hit single "All My Fault" received heavy radio and TV airplay, triggered through the song's integration in the TV movie Jailbait (2000), which even featured a cameo appearance by Fenix TX. The music video, in return, starred Alycia Purrott from the cast of Jailbait, as well as Blink-182's Hoppus. "All My Fault" reached No. 21 on the Billboard Modern Rock chart.

Lechuza and breakup 

Following the success of their MCA debut, Fenix TX went on numerous tours, including the Warped Tour and both national and international tours with label mates New Found Glory. However, in late 2000, drummer Reyes left the band to pursue other interests. To compensate, DeLaPaz took over drumming duties for the band and a search for a new guitarist commenced. In March 2001, James Love was announced as the replacement guitarist. Simultaneously, the band revealed the name of their follow-up record, Lechuza.

Lechuza was released on May 22, 2001 and debuted on No. 87 of the Billboard 200, with its single "Threesome" reaching No. 66 on the UK Singles Chart. The album featured a total of eleven songs, all of which were more raucous and energetic than those on the band's previous efforts, with occasional escapes into heavy metal-esque guitar distortion paired with screaming vocal patterns. The reason for the change in style was Lewis' and DeLaPaz's constant feelings of disapproval for the band's songs, as revealed by Salazar in an interview in late 2002: "[...] for Lechuza the guys were looking for a different direction so they wrote some songs that were way different, like Something Bad's Gonna Happen and Pasture of Muppets, just so that they could have some songs that they could, in their words, actually have fun playing onstage." One of these songs, "Beating a Dead Horse", explicitly addresses the problems that had arisen within the band.

Eventually, the continuously growing rift between Salazar and the other two founding members caused Love to leave Fenix TX shortly after the release of the album. Dennis Hill of the Southern Californian pop punk band Lefty temporarily filled his place, while a permanent replacement was found in Pivit's Chris Lewis (unrelated to bassist Adam Lewis), during a tour with P.O.D. in October 2001. However, he never legally became a member, which ultimately allowed DeLaPaz and Adam Lewis to overrule Salazar in a decision to break up the band. This occurred in the middle of the writing process for what would have become Fenix TX's third album. On September 19, 2002, the disbandment of Fenix TX was officially announced, despite Salazar's wishes to continue the band.

Denver Harbor and Sing the Body Electric 

After the breakup in September 2002, the members of Fenix TX split to form two separate bands: Salazar and Chris Lewis started the post-grunge band Denver Harbor, along with F.O.N. members Aaron and Ilan Rubin. DeLaPaz and Adam Lewis recruited singer Anthony Scalamere, bassist Jason Torbert and ex-Fenix TX guitarist James Love (who was replaced by guitarist/keyboardist Tony Montemarano in February 2004) for their experimental/hardcore side-project Big Black Boat. Soon after the formation, the name of the project was changed first to ChChCh HaHaHa and officially became Sing the Body Electric on February 15, 2004.

Denver Harbor released their debut EP Extended Play on December 16, 2003 and signed with Universal Records in May 2004. Sing the Body Electric recorded their eponymous six song EP Sing the Body Electric, which was released by Restart Records on August 10, 2004, shortly before Denver Harbor's second effort, the full-length album Scenic, issued on October 12, 2004.

Sing the Body Electric never received major recognition. Singer Anthony Scalamere, who was known for his extreme views on contemporary music—as evidenced by an incident where he bragged about assaulting a person for wearing a Dashboard Confessional T-shirt—clashed with fellow band members. On May 26, 2005, after months of inactivity and a deadlock on Sing the Body Electric's website, Scalamere proclaimed the breakup of the band on their message board in a profanity-plastered diatribe that implicated the unreachability of band members as a major factor. The post ended with the words "sing the body is dead". In response to this, Adam Lewis wrote "Well if Sing The Body Electric is dead, YOU KILLED IT!" Eventually, Adam Lewis formed another band called Sub Rosa based in Los Angeles. Damon DeLaPaz has since formed alternative rock group Demasiado and punk/metal trio Laserwolf and Thunderbolt. He performed with Ape Machine, a rock band from Portland, Oregon, and recorded as a session drummer for various bands and musicians.

Reunion 
On August 14, 2004, Fenix TX played two reunion shows with their last active line-up (consisting of Salazar, Chris Lewis, Adam Lewis and DeLaPaz) at Chain Reaction in Anaheim, California. Both shows were filmed by Drive-Thru Records and slated to be released on DVD format, along with a CD of previously unreleased material. Due to reasons unknown, neither the DVD nor the CD have been released . However, the band reunited again exactly one year later to record a live album at The Clubhouse in Tempe, Arizona, which was released under the title Purple Reign in Blood – Live on November 8, 2005.

To coincide with the new release, Fenix TX announced two farewell tours — the Before the Blackout, After the Breakup Tour in the United States, and the Drive-Thru Invasion Tour 2006 in Japan — running from October 7, 2005 until January 15, 2006. Salazar's and Chris Lewis' other band Denver Harbor supported them on the U.S. tour, which meant that both members were required to perform two sets every night. This, and repeating logistics problems, led to many dates being cancelled on the day they were scheduled. Also, halfway through the tour, DeLaPaz was asked to leave, so Ilan Rubin from Denver Harbor replaced him for the remainder of the tour.

In February 2006, the band played another three shows with No Use for a Name before heading out on a two-week tour with Unwritten Law in the beginning of March. A European tour supported by Pensive — including England, Scotland, France, and Italy — was scheduled to take place in May 2006. However, due to Salazar developing polyps on his vocal folds, the tour was cancelled.

In April 2006, it was officially announced that Ilan Rubin replaced DeLaPaz on drums, and that Fenix TX would record their follow-up to 2001's Lechuza. Beginning on April 29, 2006 at Give It a Name, Rubin also played drums for Lostprophets. Though he has since continued to be their drummer and recorded several tracks for 2006's Liberation Transmission, as well as its successor.
He was the drummer for Nine Inch Nails, but since has joined Angels & Airwaves.

On August 14, 2009 (the five-year anniversary of the first Fenix*Tx reunion) it was announced via Fenix Tx's Myspace that the original RiverFenix line-up was reuniting to begin working on new music for release sometime in 2010. However, the band later stated that the announcement of the original lineup reuniting was a mistake, and that they were reuniting with a different lineup. They went on a European tour in October 2010. Fenix Tx released three new tracks "Bending Over Backwards", "Coming Home", "Nothing Seems Bigger Than This" for their soundcloud on January 4, 2012. Fenix Tx's new song "Spooky Action At a Distance" was featured in MLB 13: The Show.

On March 22, 2016 Donnie Reyes joined the original lineup in Houston, TX for a performance at the Continental Club.

CRE.EP

On April 4, 2016, it was confirmed that Fenix TX had signed to Cyber-Tracks – the L.A based record label owned by NOFX guitarist El Hefe and his wife Jen Abeyta.  The five track E.P CRE.EP was released on September 30, 2016.

Musical style and critical reception 

During the first years of their career, Fenix TX had to struggle hard with their reputation as a Blink-182 rip-off. The Daily Athenaeum went so far as to refer to their 1999 album Fenix TX as "a very good Blink-182 album". However, other than the shared musical genre, the two bands have little in common. Due to Fenix TX's dual guitar employment, they are able to create a more complex guitar accompaniment. Also, at a time when Blink-182 relied heavily on a rudimentary guitar/bass/drum arrangement, Fenix TX made an effort to integrate other instruments, such as trombone and trumpet, as well as unconventional vocal techniques into their sound. This allowed the band to touch upon other music genres such as ska punk and hip hop, as heard in the songs "Skinhead Jessie" and "Apple Pie Cowboy Toothpaste". The latter includes a rap originally appearing in the 1984 comedy film Revenge of the Nerds. Yet, the typical Fenix TX song features an energetic — yet pop-friendly — distortion guitar-driven sound, paired with fast-paced but melodic vocal patterns. Lyrics are conventionally a mix of political, personal, and occasionally comedic topics, as heard in the songs "Minimum Wage", "Ben", and "Rooster Song", respectively.

For Fenix TX's second recording effort, the quartet tried to distinguish themselves from its peers. The resulting album, 2001's Lechuza, was split into two parts, with half of the songs written by Salazar and the other half written by Lewis and DeLaPaz. This organization resulted in a slight shift in musical style. Though a tad edgier than before, Salazar's songs were largely in the vein of Fenix TX's previous material, featuring at times comical, romantic and generally positive themes combined with the band's traditional sound. Lewis' and DeLaPaz' songs, on the other hand, were musically far more metal and hardcore-influenced and commonly featured gang vocals and more aggressive lyrics. While songs such as "Something Bad Is Gonna Happen" stand out with a very crisp lead guitar sound and a high-pitched guitar solo by James Love, "Beating a Dead Horse" (the only Fenix TX song primarily sung by Adam Lewis) contains screamed vocals and an overall hardcore feel.

Due to this stylistic disparity, Lechuza was not as well received by fans and critics as Fenix TX. In particular, the band's attempt at composing a hardcore song ("Beating a Dead Horse") elicited a great amount of criticism. In addition to the album, the band's live performances were largely discredited for their leanings towards alternative metal, rather than a pop punk style. Yet, the loyalty of many fans outweighed the disappointment over the album, though a third full-length effort by Fenix TX would have continued in a harder direction, as the member's post-breakup projects featured material that was originally intended for the follow-up to Lechuza.

Members

Musicians

Current members
 William Salazar – lead vocals, guitar (1995–2002, 2005–present)
 Chris Lewis – guitar, backing vocals (2001–2002, 2005–present)
 Adam Lewis – bass, backing vocals (1995–2002, 2005–2009, 2013–present)
 Damon DeLaPaz – drums (2000–2002, 2005–2006, 2016–present); guitar, backing vocals (1995–2000, 2005–2006, 2016–present)

Former touring members
 Hayden Scott – drums (2013–2016)

Former members
 Donnie Reyes – drums (1995–2000)
 Carl Lockstedt – lead vocals (1995; only with band as Riverfenix)
 James Love – guitar (2000–2001)
 Ilan Rubin – drums (2006–2009)
 Aaron Thompson – bass, backing vocals (2010–2012)
 Trevor Faris – drums (2010–2012)

Lineups

Timeline

Discography

Studio albums 
Riverfenix (1997; as Riverfenix)
Fenix TX (1999) US No. 115
Lechuza (2001) US No. 87

Extended plays 
G.B.O.H. (1996; as Riverfenix)
CRE.EP (2016)

Live 
Purple Reign In Blood – Live (2005)

Singles

References

Other sources 
   (Internet Archive mirror)
  
  
  
  
  
  
  
  
  
  
  
   (Internet Archive mirror)

External links 
 

Pop punk groups from Texas
Skate punk groups
Punk rock groups from Texas
Musical groups established in 1995
Musical groups disestablished in 2002
Musical groups reestablished in 2005
Musical groups from Houston
MCA Records artists
Drive-Thru Records artists